In enzymology, a mannitol-1-phosphate 5-dehydrogenase is an enzyme that catalyzes the chemical reaction

D-mannitol 1-phosphate + NAD+  D-fructose 6-phosphate + NADH + H+

Thus, the two substrates of this enzyme are D-mannitol 1-phosphate and NAD+, whereas its 3 products are fructose 6-phosphate, NADH and H+.

This enzyme belongs to the family of oxidoreductases, specifically those acting on the CH-OH group of donor with NAD+ or NADP+ as acceptor. The systematic name of this enzyme class is D-mannitol-1-phosphate:NAD+ 2-oxidoreductase. Other names in common use include hexose reductase, mannitol 1-phosphate dehydrogenase, D-mannitol-1-phosphate dehydrogenase, and fructose 6-phosphate reductase. This enzyme participates in fructose and mannose metabolism.

See also 
 D-Mannitol

References

 
 
 

EC 1.1.1
NADH-dependent enzymes
Enzymes of known structure